Havran may refer to:
 Havran (surname)
 Havran, Ottoman district in southern Syria encompassing Jabal al-Druze.
 Havran, Balıkesir, a district of Balıkesir Province in Turkey
 A peak in the Tatra mountains, Slovakia
 A peak in the Upper Palatine Forest in the Czech Republic
 Havraň, a village in the Czech Republic

See also